10 Days on the Island is a biennial cultural festival held in the island state of Tasmania, Australia.

History
The first was held in 2001, initially organised and co-ordinated by Robyn Archer.

In 2004 the event was reviewed for the Tasmanian Government, and various recommendations were made.

In 2007, the fourth edition of the festival included new commissions, with world and Australian premieres staged in 50 locations across Tasmania.

Description
The event has established a significant place in the Australian arts calendar; it is Tasmania's premier cultural event, and presents exhibitions, performances and community events in 50 locations around the island.

Notable performances
In 2017, the festival included the Tasmanian premiere of the Jane Cafarella play e-baby, a two-hander play about "matters of infertility, adoption and motherhood" in the context of gestational surrogacy which had been performed in Melbourne in 2015 and Sydney in 2016.

In March 2023 a production of Euripides' play Women of Troy, directed by Ben Winspear and starring his wife actor-producer Marta Dusseldorp was staged at the festival. Poetry by Iranian-Kurdish refugee Behrouz Boochani, who was for many years detained by the Australian Government in Manus Island detention centre, was set to music composed by Katie Noonan and performed by a chorus of Tasmanian women and girls, interspersed with the text of the play.

References

External links 
 

Festivals in Tasmania
Recurring events established in 2001